Ritenour School District is a school district located in St. Louis County, Missouri. The school district serves parts or all of Overland, St. John, St. Ann, Edmundson, Breckenridge Hills, Woodson Terrace, Sycamore Hills, and Vinita Park and Charlack. For the 2016-2017 school year, RSD served 6,289 students.

History
Ritenour School District was founded in 1846, and in 1867, it became the first school district in the St. Louis Metropolitan Area to serve African American students when it was founded. In 1913, Ritenour started educating African Americans in a separate high school as well. In 1968, RSD was a fully integrated school district teaching white and black students in the same schools. In 1981, RSD accepted a St. Louis Court issued desegregation plan and transported 50 inner city students to be educated at RSD schools. The current headquarters of Ritenour School district is located at the location of where the first school was founded.   RSD's operating budget in the 2013-2014 was $66,115,000 while its expenditures was $66,965,000 equating to more than 10,000 dollars spent per student.

Demographics
The student body for the 2016-2017 school year was 40% African American, 32% Caucasian, 18% Hispanic, 3% Asian and 7% Other/Multiracial. About 800 students in the district are English Language Learners prompting RSD to start Adult ESL classes and creating an inclusive environment for foreign students by having international cuisine events and hiring more teachers capable of handling students learning English.

Academics
The average ACT score is 18. 48% of students matriculate to college.

Schools

Pre-K
Ritenour Early Childhood Center

Elementary schools
Buder Elementary 
Iveland Elementary
Kratz Elementary 
Marion Elementary
Marvin Elementary
Wyland Elementary

Middle schools
Hoech Middle
Ritenour Middle

High schools
Ritenour Senior High

References

School districts in Missouri
Education in St. Louis County, Missouri
1846 establishments in Missouri
School districts established in 1846